The 2015 Selangor FA Season is Selangor FA's 10th season in the Malaysia Super League since its inception in 2004.

Selangor FA began the season on 7 February 2015. They competed in two domestic cups; The FA Cup Malaysia and Malaysia Cup.

Kit
Supplier: Kappa / Sponsor: Selangor

Players

First Team Squad

Transfers

Transfers in

Transfers out

Pre-season and friendlies

Selangor FA Friendlies

Friendly Match 3

Friendly Match 4

Competitions

Overview

Overall

Malaysia Super League

Table

Results summary

Results by round

Selangor FA Results
Fixtures and Results of the Malaysia Super League 2015 season.

Malaysia Super League

'

Results overview

FA Cup

Malaysia  Cup
Selangor joined the competition in the group stage.

Group stage

Knockout phase

Quarter-finals

Semi-finals

Final

Winners

Statistics

Squad statistics

Appearances (Apps.) numbers are for appearances in competitive games only including sub appearances.\
Red card numbers denote: Numbers in parentheses represent red cards overturned for wrongful dismissal.

Goalscorers
Includes all competitive matches.

Clean sheets

Disciplinary record

References

Malaysian football clubs 2015 season
Selangor FA